Blind Man's Bluff is a 1936 British drama film directed by Albert Parker and starring Basil Sydney, Enid Stamp-Taylor and James Mason. The film was a quota quickie made at Wembley Studios by the Hollywood studio Fox's British subsidiary.

Premise
A doctor invents a cure for blindness.

Cast
 Basil Sydney as Dr. Peter Fairfax 
 Enid Stamp-Taylor as Sylvia Fairfax 
 James Mason as Stephen Neville
 Barbara Greene as Vivki Sheridan 
 Iris Ashley as Claire 
 Ian Colin as Philip Stanhope 
 Wilson Coleman as Dr. Franz Morgenhardt 
 Warburton Gamble as Tracy

References

Bibliography
 Chibnall, Steve. Quota Quickies: The British of the British 'B' Film. British Film Institute, 2007.
 Low, Rachael. Filmmaking in 1930s Britain. George Allen & Unwin, 1985.
 Wood, Linda. British Films, 1927-1939. British Film Institute, 1986.

External links

1936 films
British drama films
British black-and-white films
1936 drama films
Films directed by Albert Parker
Films shot at Wembley Studios
Films set in Vienna
British films based on plays
Films about blind people
1930s English-language films
1930s British films
Quota quickies
20th Century Fox films